Beurre noir is melted butter that is cooked over low heat until the milk solids turn a very dark brown.  As soon as this happens, acid is carefully added to the hot butter, usually lemon juice or a type of vinegar.  Some recipes also add a sprig of parsley, which is removed from the hot butter before the acid is added.  It is typically served with eggs, fish, or certain types of vegetables.

See also
 Beurre blanc
 Beurre noisette
 French cuisine
 List of sauces

References 

French sauces
Butter